This is a list of butterflies of Sudan and South Sudan. About 341 species are known from the Sudans, 6 of which are  endemic.

Papilionidae

Papilioninae

Papilionini
Papilio antimachus  Drury, 1782
Papilio zalmoxis  Hewitson, 1864
Papilio nireus lyaeus  Doubleday, 1845
Papilio nireus pseudonireus  Felder & Felder, 1865
Papilio plagiatus  Aurivillius, 1898
Papilio phorcas sudanicola  Storace, 1965
Papilio rex franciscae  Carpenter, 1928
Papilio mechowi  Dewitz, 1881
Papilio mechowianus  Dewitz, 1885
Papilio echerioides joiceyi  Gabriel, 1945
Papilio jacksoni imatonga  Clifton & Collins, 1997
Papilio nobilis didingensis  Carpenter, 1928
Papilio hesperus sudana  Gabriel, 1945
Papilio lormieri  Distant, 1874
Papilio mackinnoni  Sharpe, 1891

Leptocercini
Graphium antheus (Cramer, 1779)
Graphium policenes policenes (Cramer, 1775)
Graphium policenes telloi  Hecq, 1999
Graphium colonna (Ward, 1873)
Graphium angolanus baronis (Ungemach, 1932)
Graphium ridleyanus (White, 1843)
Graphium leonidas (Fabricius, 1793)
Graphium philonoe whalleyi (Talbot, 1929)
Graphium almansor escherichi (Gaede, 1915)

Pieridae

Coliadinae
Eurema brigitta (Stoll, [1780])
Eurema hecabe solifera (Butler, 1875)
Catopsilia florella (Fabricius, 1775)
Colias electo pseudohecate  Berger, 1940
Colias marnoana  Rogenhofer, 1884

Pierinae
Colotis antevippe zera (Lucas, 1852)
Colotis aurigineus (Butler, 1883)
Colotis aurora evarne (Klug, 1829)
Colotis celimene angusi  Rothschild, 1921
Colotis celimene sudanicus (Aurivillius, 1905)
Colotis chrysonome (Klug, 1829)
Colotis daira stygia (Felder & Felder, 1865)
Colotis danae eupompe (Klug, 1829)
Colotis elgonensis basilewskyi  Berger, 1956
Colotis ephyia (Klug, 1829)
Colotis euippe exole (Reiche, 1850)
Colotis halimede (Klug, 1829)
Colotis hetaera aspasia (Ungemach, 1932)
Colotis liagore (Klug, 1829)
Colotis phisadia (Godart, 1819)
Colotis pleione nilus  Talbot, 1942
Colotis protomedia (Klug, 1829)
Colotis rogersi (Dixey, 1915)
Colotis ungemachi (Le Cerf, 1922)
Colotis vesta princeps  Talbot, 1939
Colotis vesta velleda (Lucas, 1852)
Colotis vestalis castalis (Staudinger, 1884)
Colotis eris (Klug, 1829)
Calopieris eulimene (Klug, 1829)
Eronia cleodora  Hübner, 1823
Eronia leda (Boisduval, 1847)
Pinacopterix eriphia melanarge (Butler, 1886)
Pinacopterix eriphia tritogenia (Klug, 1829)
Nepheronia argia (Fabricius, 1775)
Nepheronia buquetii (Boisduval, 1836)
Nepheronia thalassina sinalata (Suffert, 1904)
Euchloe falloui (Allard, 1867)
Leptosia alcesta inalcesta  Bernardi, 1959

Pierini
Appias epaphia contracta (Butler, 1888)
Appias phaola intermedia  Dufrane, 1948
Appias sabina (Felder & Felder, [1865])
Appias sylvia sudanensis  Talbot, 1932
Pontia glauconome  Klug, 1829
Mylothris agathina (Cramer, 1779)
Mylothris chloris (Fabricius, 1775)
Mylothris jacksoni nagichota  Talbot, 1944
Mylothris rubricosta (Mabille, 1890)
Mylothris rueppellii septentrionalis  Carpenter, 1928
Mylothris schumanni uniformis  Talbot, 1944
Dixeia dixeyi (Neave, 1904)
Dixeia doxo doxo (Godart, 1819)
Dixeia doxo venatus (Butler, 1871)
Dixeia orbona vidua (Butler, 1900)
Belenois aurota (Fabricius, 1793)
Belenois creona (Cramer, [1776])
Belenois raffrayi (Oberthür, 1878)
Belenois solilucis loveni (Aurivillius, 1921)
Belenois subeida (Felder & Felder, 1865)
Belenois sudanensis (Talbot, 1929)
Belenois theora laeta (Weymer, 1903)
Belenois thysa meldolae  Butler, 1872

Lycaenidae

Miletinae

Miletini
Megalopalpus zymna (Westwood, 1851)
Lachnocnema abyssinica  Libert, 1996
Lachnocnema emperamus (Snellen, 1872)
Lachnocnema divergens  Gaede, 1915
Lachnocnema reutlingeri  perspicua Libert, 1996

Poritiinae

Liptenini
Alaena subrubra  Bethune-Baker, 1915
Pentila pauli multiplagata  Bethune-Baker, 1908
Pentila umangiana connectens  Hulstaert, 1924
Telipna sulpitia  Hulstaert, 1924
Telipna albofasciata laplumei  Devos, 1917
Ornipholidotos overlaeti intermedia  Libert, 2005
Ornipholidotos latimargo (Hawker-Smith, 1933)
Mimacraea krausei karschioides  Carpenter & Jackson, 1950
Liptena ferrymani (Grose-Smith & Kirby, 1891)
Liptena xanthostola xantha (Grose-Smith, 1901)
Tetrarhanis ilala (Riley, 1929)
Larinopoda lircaea (Hewitson, 1866)

Epitolini
Stempfferia cercenoides (Holland, 1890)
Cephetola dolorosa (Roche, 1954)
Phytala elais ugandae  Jackson, 1964

Aphnaeinae
Pseudaletis agrippina  Druce, 1888
Chloroselas tamaniba (Walker, 1870)
Chloroselas taposana  Riley, 1932
Cigaritis acamas bellatrix (Butler, 1886)
Cigaritis nilus (Hewitson, 1865)
Zeritis neriene  Boisduval, 1836
Zeritis pulcherrima  Aurivillius, 1923
Axiocerses harpax kadugli  Talbot, 1935
Axiocerses amanga (Westwood, 1881)
Aphnaeus coronae  Talbot, 1935

Theclinae
Myrina silenus (Fabricius, 1775)
Myrina subornata nuba  Talbot, 1935
Dapidodigma demeter sudsudana  d'Abrera, 1980
Hypolycaena liara  Druce, 1890
Hypolycaena obscura  Stempffer, 1947
Leptomyrina sudanica  Stempffer, 1964
Iolaus alienus ugandae  Stempffer, 1953
Iolaus scintillans  Aurivillius, 1905
Iolaus sudanicus  Aurivillius, 1905
Iolaus pallene (Wallengren, 1857)
Iolaus menas  Druce, 1890
Iolaus ismenias (Klug, 1834)
Stugeta marmoreus (Butler, 1866)
Paradeudorix ituri ugandae (Talbot, 1935)
Hypomyrina mimetica  Libert, 2004
Deudorix dinochares  Grose-Smith, 1887
Deudorix dinomenes diomedes  Jackson, 1966
Deudorix livia (Klug, 1834)
Deudorix lorisona baronica  Ungemach, 1932
Capys bamptoni  Henning & Henning, 1988

Polyommatinae

Lycaenesthini
Anthene butleri (Oberthür, 1880)
Anthene crawshayi minuta (Bethune-Baker, 1916)
Anthene hodsoni (Talbot, 1935)
Anthene lunulata (Trimen, 1894)
Anthene wilsoni (Talbot, 1935)
Anthene lusones (Hewitson, 1874)
Anthene nigeriae (Aurivillius, 1905)

Polyommatini
Cupidopsis jobates mauritanica  Riley, 1932
Uranothauma delatorum  Heron, 1909
Uranothauma heritsia intermedia (Tite, 1958)
Leptotes marginalis (Stempffer, 1944)
Tuxentius margaritaceus (Sharpe, 1892)
Tarucus balkanicus (Freyer, 1843)
Tarucus legrasi  Stempffer, 1948
Tarucus rosacea (Austaut, 1885)
Tarucus theophrastus (Fabricius, 1793)
Tarucus ungemachi  Stempffer, 1942
Zizeeria karsandra (Moore, 1865)
Actizera stellata (Trimen, 1883)
Euchrysops alberta (Butler, 1901)
Euchrysops albistriata (Capronnier, 1889)
Euchrysops crawshayi (Butler, 1899)
Euchrysops cyclopteris (Butler, 1876)
Euchrysops nilotica (Aurivillius, 1904)
Chilades eleusis (Demaison, 1888)
Lepidochrysops albilinea  Tite, 1959
Lepidochrysops negus wau (Wichgraf, 1921)
Lepidochrysops nigrita  Tite, 1959
Lepidochrysops polydialecta (Bethune-Baker, [1923])
Lepidochrysops victoriae occidentalis  Libert & Collins, 2001

Nymphalidae

Danainae

Danaini
Danaus chrysippus chrysippus (Linnaeus, 1758)
Danaus chrysippus alcippus (Cramer, 1777)
Danaus dorippus (Klug, 1845)
Tirumala formosa neumanni (Rothschild, 1902)
Tirumala petiverana (Doubleday, 1847)
Amauris niavius aethiops  Rothschild & Jordan, 1903
Amauris tartarea  Mabille, 1876
Amauris albimaculata sudanica  Talbot, 1940
Amauris echeria mongallensis  Carpenter, 1928
Amauris echeria steckeri  Kheil, 1890
Amauris hecate (Butler, 1866)

Satyrinae

Melanitini
Gnophodes betsimena parmeno  Doubleday, 1849
Melanitis libya  Distant, 1882

Satyrini
Bicyclus angulosa (Butler, 1868)
Bicyclus campus (Karsch, 1893)
Bicyclus istaris (Plötz, 1880)
Bicyclus kenia (Rogenhofer, 1891)
Bicyclus milyas (Hewitson, 1864)
Bicyclus pavonis (Butler, 1876)
Bicyclus martius sanaos (Hewitson, 1866)
Bicyclus saussurei angustus  Condamin, 1970
Heteropsis perspicua (Trimen, 1873)
Ypthima albida  Butler, 1888
Ypthima antennata  van Son, 1955
Ypthima condamini  Kielland, 1982
Ypthima doleta  Kirby, 1880
Ypthima pupillaris  Butler, 1888
Ypthima simplicia  Butler, 1876
Ypthimomorpha itonia (Hewitson, 1865)

Charaxinae

Charaxini
Charaxes varanes vologeses (Mabille, 1876)
Charaxes fulvescens monitor  Rothschild, 1900
Charaxes boueti rectans  Rothschild & Jordan, 1903
Charaxes cynthia kinduana  Le Cerf, 1923
Charaxes lactetinctus ungemachi  Le Cerf, 1927
Charaxes jasius  Poulton, 1926
Charaxes epijasius  Reiche, 1850
Charaxes hansali baringana  Rothschild, 1905
Charaxes brutus angustus  Rothschild, 1900
Charaxes julius somalicus  Rothschild, 1900
Charaxes ansorgei kinyeti  Plantrou, 1989
Charaxes pollux (Cramer, 1775)
Charaxes druceanus vivianae  Plantrou, 1982
Charaxes eudoxus imatongensis  Plantrou, 1982
Charaxes eudoxus mechowi  Rothschild, 1900
Charaxes numenes aequatorialis  van Someren, 1972
Charaxes tiridates tiridatinus  Röber, 1936
Charaxes bipunctatus ugandensis  van Someren, 1972
Charaxes smaragdalis gobyae  Plantrou, 1989
Charaxes etesipe (Godart, 1824)
Charaxes achaemenes monticola  van Someren, 1970
Charaxes jahlusa ganalensis  Carpenter, 1937
Charaxes eupale latimargo  Joicey & Talbot, 1921
Charaxes dilutus ngonga  van Someren, 1974
Charaxes baumanni didingensis  van Someren, 1971
Charaxes etheocles carpenteri  van Someren & Jackson, 1957
Charaxes cedreatis  Hewitson, 1874
Charaxes viola picta  van Someren & Jackson, 1952
Charaxes paphianus subpallida  Joicey & Talbot, 1925
Charaxes kahldeni  Homeyer & Dewitz, 1882
Charaxes zoolina (Westwood, [1850])
Charaxes lycurgus bernardiana  Plantrou, 1978
Charaxes zelica depuncta  Joicey & Talbot, 1921
Charaxes amandae  Rydon, 1989

Euxanthini
Charaxes crossleyi ansorgei (Rothschild, 1903)

Apaturinae
Apaturopsis cleochares (Hewitson, 1873)

Nymphalinae

Nymphalini

Vanessa dimorphica (Howarth, 1966)
Junonia chorimene (Guérin-Méneville, 1844)
Junonia terea tereoides (Butler, 1901)
Junonia westermanni Westwood, 1870
Protogoniomorpha parhassus (Drury, 1782)
Protogoniomorpha temora (Felder & Felder, 1867)
Precis archesia ugandensis (McLeod, 1980)
Precis coelestina  Dewitz, 1879
Precis octavia (Cramer, 1777)
Precis tugela aurorina (Butler, 1894)
Hypolimnas anthedon (Doubleday, 1845)
Hypolimnas misippus (Linnaeus, 1764)
Hypolimnas salmacis platydema  Rothschild & Jordan, 1903
Mallika jacksoni (Sharpe, 1896)

Biblidinae

Biblidini
Byblia anvatara acheloia (Wallengren, 1857)
Mesoxantha ethosea reducta  Rothschild, 1918
Neptidopsis ophione nucleata  Grünberg, 1911

Limenitinae

Limenitidini
Pseudoneptis bugandensis  Stoneham, 1935
Pseudacraea acholica  Riley, 1932
Pseudacraea boisduvalii (Doubleday, 1845)
Pseudacraea eurytus (Linnaeus, 1758)
Pseudacraea lucretia protracta (Butler, 1874)

Neptidini
Neptis metella (Doubleday, 1848)
Neptis nemetes nemetes  Hewitson, 1868
Neptis nemetes margueriteae  Fox, 1968
Neptis occidentalis  Rothschild, 1918

Adoliadini
Catuna crithea (Drury, 1773)
Pseudargynnis hegemone (Godart, 1819)
Euphaedra medon fraudata  van Someren, 1935
Euphaedra neumanni  Rothschild, 1902
Euphaedra harpalyce sudanensis  Talbot, 1929

Heliconiinae

Acraeini
Acraea chilo  Godman, 1880
Acraea insignis  Distant, 1880
Acraea neobule  Doubleday, 1847
Acraea pseudolycia astrigera  Butler, 1899
Acraea quirina (Fabricius, 1781)
Acraea zetes (Linnaeus, 1758)
Acraea abdera  Hewitson, 1852
Acraea cepheus (Linnaeus, 1758)
Acraea egina (Cramer, 1775)
Acraea guluensis  Le Doux, 1932
Acraea caecilia (Fabricius, 1781)
Acraea caldarena  Hewitson, 1877
Acraea doubledayi  Guérin-Méneville, 1849
Acraea marnois  Rogenhofer, 1890
Acraea pseudegina  Westwood, 1852
Acraea sykesi Sharpe, 1902
Acraea aganice orientalis (Ungemach, 1932)
Acraea epaea paragea (Grose-Smith, 1900)
Acraea epiprotea (Butler, 1874)
Acraea macarista (Sharpe, 1906)
Acraea poggei nelsoni  Grose-Smith & Kirby, 1892
Acraea pseuderyta  Godman & Salvin, 1890
Acraea acerata  Hewitson, 1874
Acraea bonasia (Fabricius, 1775)
Acraea encedana  Pierre, 1976
Acraea serena (Fabricius, 1775)
Acraea esebria  Hewitson, 1861
Acraea jodutta (Fabricius, 1793)
Acraea johnstoni  Godman, 1885
Acraea lycoa  Godart, 1819
Acraea pharsalus pharsalus  Ward, 1871
Acraea pharsalus rhodina  Rothschild, 1902
Acraea oreas  Sharpe, 1891

Argynnini
Issoria hanningtoni imatonga (Riley, 1932)

Vagrantini
Lachnoptera anticlia (Hübner, 1819)
Phalanta eurytis eurytis (Doubleday, 1847)
Phalanta eurytis microps (Rothschild & Jordan, 1903)
Phalanta phalantha aethiopica (Rothschild & Jordan, 1903)

Hesperiidae

Coeliadinae
Coeliades forestan (Stoll, [1782])
Coeliades keithloa menelik (Ungemach, 1932)
Coeliades pisistratus (Fabricius, 1793)

Pyrginae

Celaenorrhinini
Celaenorrhinus proxima (Mabille, 1877)
Eretis lugens (Rogenhofer, 1891)
Eretis melania  Mabille, 1891
Eretis mixta  Evans, 1937
Sarangesa aza  Evans, 1951
Sarangesa brigida sanaga  Miller, 1964
Sarangesa laelius (Mabille, 1877)
Sarangesa lucidella (Mabille, 1891)
Sarangesa phidyle (Walker, 1870)

Tagiadini
Tagiades flesus (Fabricius, 1781)
Eagris decastigma purpura  Evans, 1937
Eagris denuba obliterata  Carpenter, 1928
Eagris lucetia (Hewitson, 1875)
Eagris tigris liberti  Collins & Larsen, 2005
Caprona adelica  Karsch, 1892
Netrobalane canopus (Trimen, 1864)
Abantis bismarcki  Karsch, 1892

Carcharodini
Spialia doris (Walker, 1870)
Spialia zebra bifida (Higgins, 1924)

Hesperiinae

Aeromachini
Prosopalpus styla  Evans, 1937
Kedestes protensa  Butler, 1901
Kedestes rogersi  Druce, 1907
Gorgyra aretina (Hewitson, 1878)
Pardaleodes incerta (Snellen, 1872)
Pardaleodes sator pusiella  Mabille, 1877
Pardaleodes tibullus (Fabricius, 1793)
Osmodes thora (Plötz, 1884)
Acleros mackenii olaus (Plötz, 1884)
Andronymus caesar philander (Hopffer, 1855)
Chondrolepis niveicornis (Plötz, 1883)
Zophopetes dysmephila (Trimen, 1868)
Gretna cylinda (Hewitson, 1876)
Caenides dacena (Hewitson, 1876)
Fresna nyassae (Hewitson, 1878)

Baorini
Borbo fallax (Gaede, 1916)
Borbo perobscura (Druce, 1912)
Gegenes nostrodamus (Fabricius, 1793)

Heteropterinae
Metisella quadrisignatus (Butler, 1894)
Metisella tsadicus (Aurivillius, 1905)
Lepella lepeletier (Latreille, 1824)

References

Seitz, A. Die Gross-Schmetterlinge der Erde 13: Die Afrikanischen Tagfalter. Plates
Seitz, A. Die Gross-Schmetterlinge der Erde 13: Die Afrikanischen Tagfalter. Text (in German)

Butterflies
Butterflies

Sudan
Sudan
Butterflies
Butterflies